Theresa Hill Arriola (also known as Isa Arriola) is a Northern Mariana Islander cultural anthropologist and indigenous rights activist from Saipan, who lectures in critical Indigenous studies in the department of sociology and anthropology at Concordia University. She is also the chair of Our Common Wealth 670, an organisation that advocates for demilitarisation of the Pacific territories of the United States.

Biography
Arriola was born in Saipan in the Northern Mariana Islands and is Chamorro. She attended the Northern Marianas Academy. She studied at Brown University for a BA in History, then for her MA in Anthropology from the University of Hawaiʻi. She studied for her doctorate at University of California at Los Angeles (UCLA) and graduated in 2021. Her thesis explored the how militarism intersects with indigenous identities and the environment in the NMI, with a particular focus on the Chamorro and Refaluwasch peoples. In 2017 she was awarded a grant by the Wenner-Gren Foundation to explore the overlapping territorial claims made by the US military and the indigenous Chamorro people.

In 2018 she joined the Board of the Northern Marianas Humanities Research Council, and has held the positions of Vice-Chair, Secretary and Treasurer. As of 2021 she is Assistant Professor of Critical Indigenous Studies in the Department of Sociology and Anthropology at Concordia University. She is a member of the Association for Social Anthropologists in Oceania.

She is Chair of Our Common Wealth 670, an organisation that advocates for "demilitarisation throughout the Marianas archipelago". She has argued publicly that levels of American military involvement in the region are unsustainable. She has also voiced concern that the US military will look at the Mariana archipelago as an alternative location for its military bases on Guam. The organisation, led by Arriola, has encouraged opposition to the US Navy's plans to extend destructive military training in the region.

Publications
Arriola, T. (2020). "Scenes from Everyday Life in the Northern Mariana Islands during the COVID-19 Pandemic," Oceania.
Arriola, T. (2020). "Securing Nature: Militarism, Indigeneity and the Environment in the Northern Mariana Islands". UCLA.

References

Year of birth missing (living people)
Living people
21st-century American women educators
21st-century American educators
21st-century American anthropologists
21st-century American women scientists
Chamorro people
Cultural anthropologists
Northern Mariana Island educators
People from Saipan
Brown University alumni
University of Hawaiʻi at Mānoa alumni
University of California, Los Angeles alumni
Academic staff of Concordia University
American women anthropologists